The 2003 Tournament of the Americas in basketball, later known as the FIBA Americas Championship and the FIBA AmeriCup (also known as Las Americas Tournament for Men, FIBA Americas Olympic Qualifying Tournament, or Panamerican Olympic Qualifying Tournament for Men), was hosted by Puerto Rico, from August 20 to August 31, 2003. The games were played in San Juan, at the Roberto Clemente Coliseum. This FIBA AmeriCup was to earn the three berths allocated to the Americas for the 2004 Olympics in Athens, Greece. The United States won the tournament, the country's fifth AmeriCup championship.

Venues 
All games were played at the Roberto Clemente Coliseum.

Qualification 
Eight teams qualified during the qualification tournaments held in their respective zones in 2003; two teams (USA and Canada) qualified automatically since they are the only members of the North America zone.
 North America: , 
 Caribbean and Central America:, 

The draw split the tournament into two groups:

Group A

Group B

Format 
 The top four teams from each group advance to the quarterfinals.
 Results and standings among teams within the same group are carried over.
 The top four teams at the quarterfinals advance to the semifinals (1 vs. 4, 2 vs. 3).
 The winners in the knockout semifinals advance to the Final, where both were granted berths in the 2004 Olympic Tournament in Athens. The losers figure in a third-place playoff where the winner was granted the third berth.

Tie-breaking criteria 
Ties are broken via the following the criteria, with the first option used first, all the way down to the last option:
 Head to head results
 Goal average (not the goal difference) between the tied teams
 Goal average of the tied teams for all teams in its group

Squads

Preliminary round 

Times given below are in Atlantic Standard Time (UTC-4).

Group A 

|}

Group B 

|}

Quarterfinal group 

The top four teams in both Group A and Group B advanced to the quarterfinal group. Then each team played the four from the other group once to complete a full round robin. Records from the preliminary groups carried over. The top four teams advanced to the semifinals.

|}

Knockout stage

Semifinals

Third place game

Final

Awards

Statistical leaders

Individual Tournament Highs 

Points

Rebounds

Assists

Steals

Blocks

Minutes

Individual Game Highs

Team Tournament Highs 

Offensive PPG

Defensive PPG

Rebounds

Assists

Steals

Blocks

Team Game highs

Final standings

References 

 2003 Panamerican Olympic Qualifying Tournament for Men, FIBA.com.

 
FIBA AmeriCup
2003 in Puerto Rican sports
International basketball competitions hosted by Puerto Rico
2003–04 in North American basketball
2003–04 in South American basketball